The first season of NYPD Blue, an American television police drama set in New York City, aired as part of the 1993–94 United States network television schedule for ABC, premiering on September 21, 1993 and concluding on May 17, 1994. The show explores the internal and external struggles of the fictional 15th precinct of Manhattan. Each episode typically intertwines several plots involving an ensemble cast. The season led to a record 26 Emmy nominations. and six awards.

Plot
John Kelly and Andy Sipowicz are detectives in the 15th squad. Sipowicz is the elder partner but is a drunk and a threat to the partnership lasting much longer. Kelly has a genuine affection for his partner but becomes increasingly exasperated by Sipowicz's behavior. In the pilot, Sipowicz is shot, and nearly killed, by Alphonse Giardella, a gangster whom Sipowicz, while drunk, insulted badly in public.  This leads to his decision to stay sober (after involuntarily drying out while in a coma) and save his job.  While his partner is recuperating, Kelly is teamed up by the squad's Lieutenant, Arthur Fancy, with a young cop from Anti-Crime, James Martinez. 

Kelly's personal life is no less complicated, as he is reluctantly going through a divorce from his wife, Laura, and is embarking on an affair with a uniformed cop, Janice Licalsi. To complicate matters further, Licalsi has been ordered to do a 'hit' on Kelly by mob boss Angelo Marino, otherwise Marino will turn in Licalsi's father, who is on his payroll. Instead, Licalsi murders Marino and the repercussions come back to haunt both her and Kelly.

Sipowicz begins a relationship with A.D.A. Sylvia Costas while another detective in the squad, Greg Medavoy, embarks on an affair of his own with the squad's new police administrative aide (P.A.A.), Donna Abandando.

Cast

Main

Recurring guest roles
Season 1's recurring guest roles include:

 David Schwimmer as Josh '4B' Goldstein (Episodes 1-4), Laura Michaels' neighbor, whose stint as a vigilante ends badly. Dies in episode 4.
 Robert Costanzo as Alphonse Giardella (Episodes 1-3, 5-7), a mobster who, after shooting and nearly killing Sipowicz in the pilot, turns State's evidence. Assassinated in episode 7.
 Joe Santos as Marino (Episodes 1-2), head mobster who wants Kelly dead for continued "business" interference.  Murdered in episode 2.
 Larry Romano as Richie Catina (Episodes 2, 9-12),
 Daniel Benzali as James Sinclair, Esq. (Episodes 1, 2, 22)
 Luis Guzman as Hector Martinez (Episodes 5, 9), Detective Martinez' father
 Michael Harney as Detective Mike Roberts (Episodes 6, 8-9, 15, 18)
 Michael DeLuise as Andy Sipowicz, Jr. (Episode 7, 19, 22)
 Bradley Whitford as Norman Gardner (Episodes 13, 21), a crusading reporter.

Episodes

Each NYPD Blue episode entry includes its original airdate in the United States, the writing and directing credits, and a plot summary. The credits and airdates are taken from the pamphlet accompanying the Region 1 Season 1 DVDs.

References

NYPD Blue seasons
Edgar Award-winning works 
1993 American television seasons
1994 American television seasons